The Democratic Peace Party is a small Egyptian political party that was formed in 2005. According to its chairman on Al-Faraeen TV (Parliament and parties program) he stated that there are about one million members in the party. The party has been described as a party that is "secular leaning but embraces an Islamic identity." The party presses for establishing peace in the region and worldwide. The party has been considered a remnant of the formerly ruling National Democratic Party.

Platform 
The party platform calls for:
 Establishing democracy.
 Solving problems of the citizens.
 Boosting Egypt's status on the regional and international arenas.
 Uprooting illiteracy.
 Ensuring women's rights.

References

External links
https://web.archive.org/web/20070119180739/http://www.sis.gov.eg/En/Politics/Parties/Parties/041102000000000021.htm

2005 establishments in Egypt
Egyptian nationalist parties
Islamic democratic political parties
Islamic political parties in Egypt
Liberal parties in Egypt
Political parties established in 2005